Jean-Pierre Bosser (born 22 March 1960) is a French former professional football player and manager. As a player, he was a defender.

Early life and career 
Bosser was born in Quimper in the Brittany region of France on 22 March 1960. During his youth career, he played for a club in the town of Pont-l'Abbé.

Club career 
A "solid" defender, Bosser began his professional career in his hometown club of Quimper. After two years there, he moved to Angers. Following two seasons at the SCO, he transferred to Montluçon, where he would only play one season. Although unrelated to his military duty, he suffered a "serious" injury that put his football career on hold for six months that year. He had been shot by a shotgun in the leg following an assault in Bénodet. That same year, he signed for Brest, the club at which he would play for six seasons. Bosser notably holds the record for the most Division 1 appearances of any Brest player. On 8 February 1986, he scored a goal from 60 meters against Toulon after the opposing goalkeeper Pascal Olmeta had gone up to midfield.

After his spell at Brest, Bosser signed for Nice in 1988. He would stay at the club a single season before moving on to Paris Saint-Germain. With PSG, he made 60 appearances, including 3 in the UEFA Cup. He finished his professional career at Mulhouse in 1993.

International career 
Bosser played one match for the Brittany national team in 1988. It was an indoor match that Brittany won 6–2 over the United States.

Managerial career 
After retiring from professional football, Bosser became a player-manager for several small Breton clubs. He went on to coach Guilvinec, Crozon Morgat (where he would oversee four successive promotions from the Promotion d'Honneur up to the Division d'Honneur), Pont-l'Abbé (his former youth club), Coray, Plozévet, and Landudec. In June 2011, he became the manager of Marcassins de Trégoat.

After one and a half seasons at Marcassins, Bosser joined Saint-Denis in Réunion. There, he signed a contract from 1 February to 31 December 2013. However, this experience turned out to be a failure for him, as the club suffered relegation to the second tier.

Career statistics

References

External links 
 

1960 births
Living people
Sportspeople from Quimper
French footballers
French football managers
Footballers from Brittany
Association football defenders
Association football player-managers
Brittany international footballers
Quimper Kerfeunteun F.C. players
Angers SCO players
Montluçon Football players
Stade Brestois 29 players
OGC Nice players
Paris Saint-Germain F.C. players
FC Mulhouse players
Ligue 2 players
Ligue 1 players
Saint-Denis FC managers